Milenko Topić (born 6 March 1969) is a Serbian professional basketball coach and former player.

Playing career 
A power forward, Topić spent most of his professional career playing in the YUBA League, representing Profikolor, BFC Beočin, Crvena zvezda, Budućnost, and Hemofarm. In the later career, he also played in Italy for Montepaschi Siena and Olimpia Milano, as well as in Greece for Rethymno, until his retirement in 2008.

National team career
Topić was a member of the Yugoslavia national team (representing FR Yugoslavia) that won the silver medal at the 1996 Summer Olympics in Atlanta, Georgia, US. Over five tournament games, he averaged 2.2 points, 3.6 rebounds and one assist per game. Topić won the gold medal at EuroBasket 1997 in Spain. Over nine tournament games, he averaged 5.8 points, 2.6 rebounds and 0.6 assists per game while shooting 72.7% from the field. He was a member of the Yugoslavia team that won the gold medal at the 1998 FIBA World Championship in Athens, Greece. Over eight tournament games, he averaged 6.7 points, 4.7 rebounds and 0.8 assists per game. Topić won the bronze medal at EuroBasket 1999 in France. Over nine tournament games, he averaged 3.9 points, 2.1 rebounds and 0.6 assists per game.

Coaching career 
Topić spent the 2015–16 season working as an assistant coach for the Hungarian team SZTE-Szedeák.

Crvena zvezda 
On 21 July 2017, Topić joined Crvena zvezda coaching staff after Serbian coach Dušan Alimpijević become their head coach for the 2017–18 season. On 8 May 2018 he became an interim head coach for the Zvezda after Alimpijević was sacked. On 10 May he made his debut in an 84–74 home win against Borac Čačak. He finished his stint undefeated with a 10–0 record. In July 2018, Milan Tomić became the head coach for Crvena zvezda while Topić was moved back to the assistant coach role. In June 2020, Crvena zvezda parted ways with him.

Career achievements and awards
As head coach
 Serbian League champion: 1  (with Crvena zvezda: 2017–18)
As assistant coach
 Adriatic League champion: 1  (with Crvena zvezda: 2018–19)
 Serbian League champion: 1  (with Crvena zvezda: 2018–19)
 Adriatic Supercup winner: 1  (with Crvena zvezda: 2018)
As player
 FIBA Saporta Cup champion: 1 (with Montepaschi Siena: 2001–02)
 Adriatic League champion: 1 (with Hemofarm: 2004–05)
 FR Yugoslav League champion: 3 (with Crvena zvezda: 1997–98; with Budućnost Podgorica: 1999–00, 2000–01)

Individual
 Adriatic League season steals leader: 2006–07

Personal life 
His son Nikola (born 2005 in Novi Sad) is a junior basketball player. In June 2020, Nikola signed a scholarship contract with the Crvena zvezda youth system. His son made a debut for Crvena zvezda in March 2022, at age 16.

See also 

 List of KK Crvena zvezda head coaches
 List of father-and-son combinations who have played for Crvena zvezda

References

External links
 Coach profile at eurobasket.com
 Milenko Topić at legabasket.it
 Milenko Topić at adriaticbasket.com

1969 births
Living people
1998 FIBA World Championship players
ABA League players
Basketball players at the 1996 Summer Olympics
FIBA EuroBasket-winning players
FIBA World Championship-winning players
KK BFC players
KK Budućnost players
KK Crvena zvezda assistant coaches
KK Crvena zvezda players
KK Hemofarm players
KK Profikolor players
Medalists at the 1996 Summer Olympics
Mens Sana Basket players
Olimpia Milano players
Olympic basketball players of Yugoslavia
Olympic medalists in basketball
Olympic silver medalists for Serbia and Montenegro
Power forwards (basketball)
Rethymno B.C. players
Serbian expatriate basketball people in Greece
Serbian expatriate basketball people in Hungary
Serbian expatriate basketball people in Italy
Serbian expatriate basketball people in Montenegro
Serbian men's basketball coaches
Serbian men's basketball players
Sportspeople from Pančevo